Fuad Gazibegović is a Slovenian footballer of Bosniak descent, who can play as a midfielder or defender. He played for nine clubs in Bosnia, Slovenia, Austria and Iceland.

External links
PrvaLiga profile 

1982 births
Living people
Footballers from Ljubljana
Slovenian people of Bosnia and Herzegovina descent
Slovenian people of Bosniak descent
Slovenian footballers
NK Ivančna Gorica players
NK Krško players
ND Ilirija 1911 players
Slovenian expatriate footballers
Slovenian expatriate sportspeople in Austria
Expatriate footballers in Austria
Expatriate footballers in Iceland
Slovenian PrvaLiga players
Association football midfielders
Knattspyrnudeild Keflavík players
Association football defenders
Slovenian expatriate sportspeople in Iceland